Belle Gunness, born Brynhild Paulsdatter Størseth (November 11, 1859 – possibly April 28, 1908), nicknamed Hell's Belle, was a Norwegian-American serial killer who was active in Illinois and Indiana between 1884 and 1908. Gunness is thought to have killed at least fourteen people, most of whom were men she enticed to visit her rural Indiana property through personal advertisements, while some sources speculate her involvement in as many as forty murders. Gunness seemingly died in a fire in 1908, but it is popularly believed that she faked her death. Her actual fate is unconfirmed.

Early life
Belle Gunness was born Brynhild Paulsdatter Størseth in Selbu, Sør-Trøndelag, Norway, on November 11, 1859 to Paul and Berit Størseth; she was the youngest of eight children. She was confirmed at the Church of Norway in 1874. 

At age 14, Gunness began working for neighboring farms by milking and herding cattle to save enough money for passage to New York City. She moved to the United States in 1881. When she was processed by immigration at Castle Garden, she changed her first name to Belle, then travelled to Chicago to join her sister, Nellie, who had immigrated several years earlier. In Chicago, while living with her sister and brother-in-law, Gunness worked as a domestic servant, then got a job at a butcher's shop cutting up animal carcasses. 

She was at least 5'7" (170 cm) and weighed around 95 - 113 kg (210 - 250 lbs) and was physically strong and masculine in appearance.

Deaths associated with Gunness

Mads Sorenson and children 
Gunness married Mads Sorenson in 1884. The couple owned a candy store which later burned to the ground. Their home had also burned down, and both instances granted the couple insurance payouts.

Two babies in Gunness' home died from inflammation of the large intestine, which can result from poisoning. Gunness had insured both of the children and collected a large insurance check after each death. Neighbors gossiped about the babies, since Gunness never appeared to be pregnant.

Sorenson had purchased two life insurance policies. On July 30, 1900, both policies were active at the same time, as one would expire that day and the other would enter into force. Sorenson died of cerebral hemorrhage that day. Gunness explained he had come home with a headache and she provided him with quinine powder for the pain; she later checked on him and he was dead. Gunness collected money from both the expiring life insurance policy, and the one that went into effect that day, making a total of $5,000. With the insurance money, she moved to La Porte, Indiana, and bought a pig farm.

Peter Gunness 
Belle married Peter Gunness on April 1, 1902. The following week, while Peter was out of the house, his infant daughter died of unknown causes in Belle's care.

Peter died eight months later due to a skull injury. Belle explained that Peter reached for something on a high shelf and a meat grinder fell on him, smashing his skull. The district coroner convened a coroner's jury, suspecting murder, but nothing came of the case. Belle collected $3,000 insurance money for Peter's death.

Disappearances 
Gunness began placing marriage ads in Chicago newspapers in 1905. One of her ads was answered by a Wisconsin farmhand, Henry Gurholt. After travelling to La Porte, Gurholt wrote his family, saying that he liked the farm, was in good health, and requesting that they send him seed potatoes. When they failed to hear from him after that, the family contacted Gunness. She told them Gurholt had gone off with horse traders to Chicago. She kept his trunk and fur overcoat.

John Moe of Minnesota answered Gunness's ad in 1906. After they had corresponded for several months, Moe travelled to La Porte and withdrew a large amount of cash. Although no one ever saw Moe again, a carpenter who did occasional work for Gunness observed that Moe's trunk remained in her house, along with more than a dozen others.

Andrew Helgelien and discovery of multiple graves 

Her criminal activities came to light in April 1908, when the Gunness farmhouse in La Porte, Indiana burned to
the ground. In the ruins, authorities found the bodies of a headless adult woman, initially identified as Belle Gunness, and her three children. Further investigation unearthed the partial remains of at least 11 additional people on the Gunness property.

After the fire at the Gunness homestead led to the discovery of bodies believed to be Gunness and her children, La Porte police authorities were contacted by Asle Helgelien, who had found correspondence between his brother, Andrew Helgelien, and Gunness; the letters included petitions for him to relocate to La Porte, to bring money, and to keep the move a secret. A visit by Asle Helgelien to the Gunness farm with a former hired hand led to attention being paid to "soft depressions" in what had been made into a pen for hogs; after briefly digging one of the depressions in the lot, a gunny sack was found that contained "two hands, two feet, and one head", which Helgelien recognized to be those of his brother.

Immediate inspection of the site revealed that there were dozens of such "slumped depressions" in the Gunness yard, and further digging and investigation at the site yielded multiple burlap sacks containing "torsos and hands, arms hacked from the shoulders down, masses of human bone wrapped in loose flesh that dripped like jelly", from trash-covered depressions that proved to be graves. In each case, the body had been butchered in the same manner—the body decapitated, the arms removed at the shoulders, and the legs severed at the knees. Blunt trauma and gashes characterized the skulls that were found that had been separated from the bodies. Lucas Reilly, quoting The Chicago Inter Ocean in Mental Floss, noted thatThe bones had been crushed on the ends, as though they had been... struck with hammers after they were dismembered... [and that] Quicklime had been scattered over the faces and stuffed in the ears. After finding the parts of five bodies on the first day, and an additional six on the second—some in shallow graves under the original hog pen, others near an outhouse or a lake—"the police stopped counting". With these discoveries, the perceptions of Belle Gunness, as reported in newspaper descriptions of a praiseworthy woman—dying in the fire that consumed her house, "in a desperate attempt to save her children"—were reassessed. Despite the initial success with the identification of Andrew Helgelien, and despite the fact that widening news coverage of the mass murders invited inquiries from families with men that had gone missing, "[m]ost of the remains could not be identified."

Involvement of Ray Lamphere 
Ray Lamphere was Gunness' hired hand and on-and-off lover. In November 1908, Lamphere was convicted of arson in connection with the fire at Gunness' house. Lamphere later confessed that Gunness had placed advertisements seeking male companionship, only to murder and rob the men who responded and subsequently visited her on the farm. Lamphere stated that Gunness asked him to burn down the farmhouse with her children inside. Lamphere also asserted that the body thought to be Gunness's was in fact a murder victim, chosen and planted to mislead investigators. The brother of one victim had warned Gunness that he might arrive at the farm shortly to investigate his brother's disappearance. According to Lamphere, this impending visit motivated Gunness to destroy her house, fake her own death, and flee. When Lamphere was arrested, he was wearing John Moe's overcoat and Henry Gurholt's watch.

Edward Bechly, a journalist, was given a secret assignment to acquire access to a confession and publish it, thus bringing a second, inconsistent Lamphere account to light. The second account is based on the report that Lamphere contacted a Reverend Edwin Schell and provided him with a verbal confession that Schell transcribed and had Lamphere sign, a document that Schell kept sealed in his personal safe. Bechly attempted to convince Schell to allow him to publish this later confession, but was denied by both Schell and Schell's wife. However, a separate newspaper published a story with speculation regarding the second Lamphere confession.  Described as worried as to the peace of the families of the victims, Schell offered the confession to Bechly, which was later published. The Bechly narrative, entitled "Lanphere's Confession" [sic], contains this summary from Bechly: In the confession, Lanphere [sic] said that he had killed Mrs. Gunness and children with an ax, sprinkled the bodies with kerosene and set fire to them and the house. It gave details of the slaying, and told of his part in the former murders which occurred at the Gunness farm, his task usually being the burying of the bodies in the garden. The essential fact, however, was that the murderess was not alive as a fugitive. The publication of Lamphere's confession resulted in the subsequent arrest of his accomplice Elisabeth Smith. The inconsistencies between the two confessions, including the matter of the survival of Belle Gunness, remain historical issues that are not fully resolved.

Legacy
Belle Gunness was pronounced dead, even though the doctor who performed the postmortem testified that the headless body was five inches shorter and about fifty pounds lighter than Gunness. No explanation was provided for what happened to the body's head. Whether Gunness died in the fire or escaped remained uncertain, although the sheriff blamed a Chicago American reporter for inventing the "escaped" story. Reported "sightings" of  Gunness in the Chicago area continued long after she was declared dead. At the time, police looked into reports of women suspected to be Belle, none of which led to her apprehension. In 2008, DNA tests were performed on the headless corpse in an attempt to compare the DNA in the corpse against a sample from a letter Gunness had sent to one of her victims, but due to its age the sample was not able to be properly tested.

After Gunness' crimes came to light, the Gunness farm became a tourist attraction. Spectators came from across the country to see the mass graves, and concessions and souvenirs were sold. Moreover, the crime became an acknowledged part of area history: the La Porte County Historical Society Museum has a permanent "Belle Gunness" exhibit.

Gunness has also been the subject of at least two American musical ballads.

Method, a 2004 film starring Elizabeth Hurley as Rebecca who is portraying Gunness in a film within the film, being shot in Romania.

In 2017, true crime podcast My Favorite Murder performed and later released a live episode detailing Gunness' crimes.

The Farm, a 2021 film starring Traci Lords, is based on the Belle Gunness story.

Hell's Princess: The Mystery of Belle Gunness, Butcher of Men is a 2018 non-fiction book by Harold Schechter on the life of Belle Gunness.

In the Garden of Spite: A Novel of the Black Widow of LaPorte is a US-published 2021 novel by Camilla Bruce with elements of "Norwegian noir and true crime" based on the life of Belle Gunness. It was published in the UK with the title Triflers need not apply

See also
 Lonely hearts killer
 List of fugitives from justice who disappeared
 List of unsolved murders

General:
 List of serial killers in the United States
 List of serial killers by number of victims

References

Further reading
 Janet L. Langlois (1985). Belle Gunness, the Lady Bluebeard: Narrative Use of a Deviant Woman. In: Susan J. Kalcik, Rosan A. Jordan (editors) (1985). Women's Folklore, Women's Culture. Philadelphia: University of Pennsylvania Press. . Pages 109–124.
 Anne Berit Vestby (2006). Only Belle: Bare Belle - En seriemorder fra Selbu.
 Lillian de la Torre (1955). The Truth about Belle Gunness (MysteriousPress.com/Open Road)

1859 births
1908 murders in the United States
19th-century American criminals
19th-century American women
19th-century Norwegian criminals
19th-century Norwegian women
20th-century American criminals
20th-century American people
20th-century American women
20th-century Norwegian criminals
20th-century Norwegian women
American female serial killers
American murderers of children
Crimes in Indiana
Filicides in the United States
Murderers for life insurance money
Norwegian emigrants to the United States
Norwegian female criminals
Norwegian female serial killers
Norwegian murderers of children
People from Selbu